The College of Saint Benedict and Saint John's University are two closely related private, Catholic higher education institutions in Minnesota. The College of Saint Benedict is a women's college located in St. Joseph, while Saint John's University (nicknamed Johnnies) is a men's college in Collegeville. Students at the institutions, both of which are Benedictine, have a shared curriculum and access to the resources of both campuses.

History

College of Saint Benedict 

The College of St. Benedict is a four-year undergraduate institution. The college opened in 1913, with six students enrolled, and grew out of St. Benedict's Academy, which was founded by Saint Benedict's Monastery in 1889. The Benedictine community incorporated CSB in 1961.

Saint John's University 
Saint John's University was founded in 1857 by the Benedictine monks of Saint John's Abbey, having emigrated from the Kingdom of Bavaria, under the patronage of King Ludwig II. In addition to its undergraduate offerings, SJU includes Saint John's School of Theology and Seminary (SOT), a graduate school that confers Master of Divinity and master of arts degrees and also prepares seminarians for the priesthood.

Minnesota Public Radio began on January 22, 1967, when KSJR signed on from the campus of Saint John's University. The station's director of broadcasting was SJU alumnus Bill Kling.

SJU has produced its own coarse-grained bread, Johnnie Bread, since 1856, and used the proceeds to fund projects such as the Abbey Church.

Institutional partnership 

Starting in 1955, CSB and SJU began offering joint evening classes. The relationship expanded soon after CSB incorporated in 1961, and since then the two institutions have shared a common academic program. Men and women attend classes together on both campuses. About 4,000 students are enrolled in CSB/SJU combined. They attend coed classes taught by a joint faculty of approximately 350 professors, mostly full-time, permanent appointees.

Academics 

Ninety percent of CSB/SJU graduates finish in four years, 95% of CSB/SJU students receive financial aid, and 95% of CSB/SJU alums rate their college experience as good or excellent.
CSB and SJU have produced two Rhodes Scholars; six Truman Scholars; and at least two Goldwater Scholars. CSB/SJU is also a consistent producer of Fulbright scholarship winners. From 2013 to 2020, 39 students from CSB/SJU received Fulbright Scholarships. CSB/SJU has also been recently recognized as a top producer of Peace Corps volunteers.

The most popular majors at St. Benedict, by 2021 graduates, were:
Psychology (54)
Biology/Biological Sciences (48)
Registered Nursing/Registered Nurse (46)
Elementary Education and Teaching (42)
Accounting (29)
Speech Communication and Rhetoric (29)

The most popular undergraduate majors at St. John's, by 2021 graduates, were:
Business Administration and Management, General (64)
Accounting (52)
Computer Science (33)
Biology/Biological Sciences (27)
Speech Communication and Rhetoric (25)
Economics (24)
Psychology (23)

85% of CSB and SJU professors are full-time, the student-to-faculty ratio is 12:1, and the average class size is 19.

Phi Beta Kappa 
Phi Beta Kappa is the nation's oldest academic honor society. CSB/SJU's Phi Beta Kappa chapter, Theta of Minnesota, was established in 2009.

Study abroad 

CSB/SJU has achieved national recognition for its strength in study abroad and international education opportunities. The Institute of International Education ranks CSB/SJU among the top baccalaureate institutions in the nation for the number of students who study abroad. According to Open Doors 2018, CSB/SJU ranked second in the nation among undergraduate institutions for participation in semester-long study abroad programs. There are 17 semester-long study abroad sites available on six different continents. These destinations include: Austria, Chile, China, France, Germany, Greece/Italy, Japan, London, Australia, Guatemala, South Africa, Spain, Northern Ireland and multiple cities in Republic of Ireland.

Internationalization 

CSB/SJU enroll approximately 250 students from 50 countries and offer 200 undergraduate courses that have a global focus. In 2012, CSB/SJU received the Senator Paul Simon Award for Comprehensive Internationalization.

Music 
The CSB/SJU music department is expansive considering the size of the school; over half of the students at CSB/SJU participate in some kind of music ensemble. The department of music has many ensembles including four choirs, an orchestra, a wind ensemble, a jazz ensemble, and several small chamber ensembles. Many of these ensembles tour extensively both domestically and abroad. The department also presents an opera every year and recently performed a Stephen Paulus oratorio about the Holocaust entitled "To Be Certain of the Dawn", jointly with choirs and orchestra from Saint Cloud State University in Europe in May 2008. There are also several student-run groups, including the male a cappella group Johnnie Blend and the female a cappella group CSBeats.

Center for Ethical Leadership in Action 
In 2017, an anonymous donor provided a $10-million gift to create the Center for Ethical Leadership in Action at the College of Saint Benedict. This gift is now used to fund student experiences and research as well as provide financial assistance for students completing unpaid internships.

Campus 

Since CSB and SJU are located about three and a half miles apart, a regular inter-campus bus service known as "The Link" connects the campuses.

Marcel Breuer, renowned Brutalist architect, designed several buildings on the Saint John's campus in the 1960s, including the Saint John's Abbey Church and bell banner; Alcuin Library; Peter Engel Science Center; the Ecumenical Institute, and Saints Thomas, Bernard, Boniface, and Patrick Residence Halls.

The central cores of the College of Saint Benedict and Saint John's University are both listed as historic districts on the National Register of Historic Places.

Saint John's Outdoor University 
The Saint John's Outdoor University consists of four different branches which include the Peer Resource Program (PRP), Outdoor Leadership Center (OLC), Saint John's Abby Arboretum, and Saint John's Maple Syrup. 
 The PRP mission statement is to challenge students to learn new physical and mental skills that will push them out of their comfort zone and allow them to develop leadership skills and increased self-confidence through wilderness trips, challenge courses, and on-campus events. The PRP also sponsors Collegebound, a pre-orientation wilderness trip for incoming freshman to northern Minnesota.
 The mission of the OLC is to promote experiential learning through outdoor programming, provide alternative outdoor leadership opportunities, and introduce CSB/SJU community to new areas of the outdoors. The OLC achieves this by sponsoring on-campus programs and clinics and by providing students with access to outdoor equipment.
 The SJU campus is surrounded by Saint John's Arboretum, more than 2,500 acres of oak savanna, forest, prairie, wetlands, and lakes. These lands were designated as natural arboretum in 1997. The Arboretum is crisscrossed with groomed Nordic skiing and hiking trails, including the popular "chapel walk" along Lake Sagatagan to Stella Maris Chapel.
 Starting in 1942, monks at the Saint John's Abbey began making maple syrup due to sugar shortages caused by World War II. The tradition of making Saint John's Maple Syrup has continued ever since, and remains a popular outdoor education opportunity for local schools. Saint John's Maple Syrup is made annually by the dedicated community and CSB/SJU student volunteers, and in 2019 alone over 2,800 people participated in the syrup making process in some capacity.

Sustainability 
As a result of their strong Benedictine tradition and belief in stewardship, CSB-SJU place a high value on sustainability. CSB/SJU was listed in "The Princeton Review's Guide to 361 Green Colleges: 2016 Edition" as an institution that "demonstrates notable commitments to sustainability in their academic offerings, campus infrastructure, activities and career preparation." The campuses each have their own sustainability office to foster a strong culture of sustainability among the students and the broader community. The institutions signed the American College and University Presidents' Climate Commitment (ACUPCC) in 2007, which formalized their goal of achieving carbon neutrality by 2035. Dramatic steps have been taken by CSB/SJU to reduce greenhouse gas emissions. In the most recent report, Saint John's reported a 56 per cent reduction in emissions since 2008 levels. Both institutions also complete STARS reports on sustainability and are signatories of the Catholic Climate Covenant. CSB/SJU seeks to educate and engage the campus community through hosting events, speakers, energy challenges, and other activities.

Saint John's Abbey Energy Farm. The Saint John's Abbey is well known for having one of the largest solar fields in the state. The original 3.9-acre facility was built in 2009, and its tracking panels provide the university with about 4% of its annual energy needs and up to 20% of its real-time needs in peak conditions. In 2014, the Solar Farm was expanded to include 616 additional fixed panels. These new panels will allow the Solar Farm to produce more than 600 kilowatts of electricity—enough energy to power up to 30% of the SJU campus in peak conditions, and 6% of its energy annually. This project creates a research opportunity for students and others to compare the performance differences between the two types of panels.

Fine arts 
Fine Arts Programming is a department of CSB-SJU that presents professional performances and art exhibitions from a range of national and international artists, and also supports and enhances the academic mission of CSB-SJU through its programming, resources, and personnel. Events take place in either the Benedicta Arts Center, a performing and visual arts center located on the CSB campus, or the Stephen B. Humphrey Theater or Alice R. Rogers Gallery and Target Gallery in the Art Center at SJU.

The Benedicta Arts Center is home to Escher Auditorium, Gorecki Family Theater, Colman Black Box Theater, Darnall Amphitheater, Helgeson Dance Studio, Gorecki Gallery & Gallery Lounge, the BAC Box Office, and classroom and rehearsal spaces, faculty and staff offices, and other music, theater, and art-related spaces.

Residential life

Residency requirement 

Both Saint John's University and College of Saint Benedict have a four-year residency requirement, which requires students to live on-campus for four years.

Saint John's residence halls 
First-year and sophomore halls consist of two-person dorm rooms. First-year dorms include Saint Thomas Aquinas Hall (Tommy Hall) and Saint Mary Hall. Many sophomores, and some juniors live in four residence halls: St. Bernard (Bernie), St. Boniface (Bonnie), St. Patrick (Pat), and St. Benet as well as the first floor of Tommy Hall. There are also on-campus apartment options for juniors and seniors, including Placid House, Maur House, Saint Vincent Court, Metten Court, and Flynntown Apartments.

St. Benedict residence halls 
First-year residence halls include Corona, Aurora, and Regina which have singles, doubles, and triples for rooms. Sophomores live in three residence halls: Lottie, Brian, and Margretta. Juniors and seniors can live in either the West Apartments (Dominica, Gable, Girgen, Schumacher, Smith, Sohler, and Westkaemper), the East Apartments (Luetmer, McDonald, Wirth, and Zierden), or in the College Avenue Apartments, which consists of two buildings and houses 33 students in one-person or two-person units with private bedrooms.  Opened for housing in the fall of 2012, Centennial Commons is the newest addition to CSB's residential facilities. Students can also choose to live in "living communities" such as the Health and Wellness Community, as well as in other campus houses, such as the Rainbow House or the Anne House.

Rankings 
The College of Saint Benedict and Saint John's University both consistently rank among the top 100 liberal arts colleges in the country. In 2017, ''U.S. News & World Report'' ranked St. John's University as tied for the 77th-best liberal arts college in the United States, and College of St. Benedict as tied for the 87th-best liberal arts college in the United States.

CSB and SJU are two of the nation's best colleges for students seeking great academics, outstanding career preparation, and generous financial aid, according to The Princeton Review's book Colleges That Pay You Back: The 200 Best Value Colleges and What It Takes to Get In – 2015 Edition.

CSB-SJU were rated very highly in MONEY's list of Best Liberal Arts Colleges for 2016 (SJU was No. 3, while CSB was No. 11) and lower as Best Colleges overall (SJU was No. 25, while CSB was No. 47). In the Best Colleges list, CSB and SJU were the only two institutions in Minnesota ranked in the top 50. They also rated well in MONEY's 2015 lists.

Student life

Student government 
The Saint John's Senate (SJS) is SJU's elected student government, and the Saint Ben's Senate (SBS) is CSB's elected student government. 

The Senates, while individually governing in the interest of their own student body, work closely together with students, faculty, staff, and university administrators to enhance all aspects of student life.

Student-run media 
All student media are run independently of the CSB-SJU administration.

The Record: The official SJU newspaper since 1888, The Record also became the official newspaper of CSB in 2001. Its coverage is exclusively focused on CSB/SJU related news and sports. It also features an opinion section, with articles sourced via submissions from students, faculty, and community members. The newspaper is published weekly during the fall and spring semesters and has been recognized among the best weekly college newspapers in Minnesota and the U.S. The Record is a member of the Associated Collegiate Press (ACP) and the Minnesota Newspaper Association, and has won awards from each body for its work. Most recently, it took home second place accolades for General Excellence at the 2019 ACP "Best of the Midwest" awards. All content is written, edited, and designed by student volunteers. All back issues of CSB newspapers are available through Vivarium, the CSB/SJU Digital Image Collection.
 Johnnie Bennie Media: Johnnie Bennie Media is "a student-run organization that strives to provide engaging learning opportunities for students at the College of Saint Benedict and Saint John's University while producing relevant media content for the campus communities. Johnnie Bennie Media's goal is to foster media literacy as part of the organization's partnership with Media Services and Clemens and Alcuin libraries." Alcuin Library's new Dietrich Reinhart Learning Commons features a state-of-the-art video studio, control room, and editing room. Johnnie Bennie Media combines four previously existing student clubs: Johnnie Bennie Campus News, KJNB Radio, Johnnie Bennie Productions, and the StreamTeam.
 Johnnie Bennie Campus News: Produces a weekly online video news show highlighting CSB/SJU events and information.
 KJNB: The official CSB/SJU student-run radio station allows students to host an hour-long talk and music-oriented shows. Broadcasts are streamed online, on closed-circuit campus TV Channel 8. When KJNB first started out in 1954 (as KSJU), it was a carrier-current AM station located in the basement of Mary Hall, which broadcast on FM from 1977 to 1988. In 2001, the studio moved to its current location in the lower level of Guild Hall. New automation software was recently purchased "to allow for operating, organizing, and scheduling the streaming audio content.
 Johnnie Bennie Productions: Creates online video programming that includes talk shows, short films, and documentaries.
 StreamTeam: A CSB/SJU group that provides live streaming of SJU athletic events."
Extending the LINK: (ETL) is a non-profit student-founded and run documentary organization. Every year ETL identifies one under-reported global social justice issue to highlight in their documentary. In the process of filming, a small group of students from ETL travel to the international location to film in the country, and return to CSB/SJU to share their film. ETL's mission states that "Through the creation of annual documentaries, ETL fosters discussion on global issues. By applying these documentaries as vehicles for positive social change, ETL inspires and empowers students, faculty, alumni and the greater community to work for improved social justice at home and abroad."

Current presidents 
Laurie Hamen, J.D.,  currently serves as the interim president of the College of Saint Benedict. She is the College of Saint Benedict's sixteenth president. Hamen became president of the college on July 1, 2020, after serving for six years as the president of Mount Mercy University in Cedar Rapids, Iowa. She graduated from St. Catherine University in St. Paul, Minnesota, and holds a master's degree in educational administration from Winona State University and a Juris Doctor from DePaul University College of Law in Chicago. Hamen succeeded former CSB president Mary Dana Hinton, PhD who now sits as the thirteenth president of Hollins University in Roanoke, Virginia.

James H. Mullin Jr., Ed.D. currently serves as the transitional president of Saint John's University. Mullin assumed the role following the departure of Eugene McAlister, PhD, who was the fourteenth president of the university and just the second lay president in the history of the institution. Mullin previously served as president of Allegheny College in Pennsylvania (2008-19), and president in residence at Harvard Graduate School of Education (2019).

In March 2021, the two institutions announced plans to hire Brian J. Bruess, PhD as their first ever joint-president. Bruess previously served as president of St. Norbert College (2017-2021) and COO of St. Catherine's University in St. Paul, Minn.

Hill Museum & Manuscript Library 
The Hill Museum & Manuscript Library (HMML), located on the SJU campus, is globally recognized non-profit organization whose mission is to identify, digitally photograph, catalog, and archive the contents of manuscripts belonging to threatened communities worldwide, with the goal of making the contents available for public use. Since 1965, HMML has partnered with 540 libraries and archives to photograph more than 140,000 manuscript books dating from the ancient to early modern eras, totaling some 40 million handwritten pages. Altogether, HMML's collections represent the single largest collection of digitized manuscripts in the world.

HMML is also home to an extensive collection of religious artwork, including The Saint John's Bible, 65 incunabula, over 800 sixteenth-century imprints, and pre-modern engravings and etchings by a range of European artists. The Saint John's Bible is an entirely handwritten and illuminated Bible, believed to be the first handwritten and illuminated Bible commissioned by a monastery since the invention of the printing press.

Athletics 
The College of Saint Benedict (CSB) and Saint John's University (SJU) are members of the Division III level of the National Collegiate Athletic Association (NCAA), primarily competing in the Minnesota Intercollegiate Athletic Conference (MIAC). Their athletic teams are respectively known as the Bennies and the Johnnies.

Johnnies athletics (SJU) 
Saint John's (SJU) joined the MIAC since the 1920–21 academic year, and competes in 11 intercollegiate varsity sports, which are: baseball, basketball, cross country, football, golf, ice hockey, soccer, swimming & diving, tennis, track & field and wrestling.

 Baseball: The Johnnies finished the 2012 season second with a MIAC record of 14–6 and a total of 29 wins. This tied an SJU record for most wins in a season. The team also qualified for the NCAA tournament for the first time since 1998. This was the third time the Johnnies were able to claim the MIAC Playoff championship. The head coach, Jerry Haugen, has coached the SJU baseball team for 36 seasons with a career record of 665-567-5. He is in the top 25 on the NCAA Division III most winning active coaches win list.
 Basketball: SJU tied for fifth and played in the playoffs. The SJU basketball team ended the 2012–2013 season with a loss to Augsburg in the quarterfinal round of the MIAC playoffs. Their record for the season was 74–67. Three Johnnies earned All-MIAC recognition. The head coach of this team is Jim Smith, and he has a 755–535 career record. The 2013–2014 season will be his 50th season coaching the Johnnies.
 Cross country: The cross country team of Saint John's finished fourth of 27 teams at the NCAA Central Regional. They followed behind St. Olaf, Central of Iowa, and Luther of Iowa. The Johnnies were ranked seventh in regular season. The 2012 SJU cross country team earned U.S. Track & Field Cross Country Coaches' Association All-Academic recognition.
 Football: St. John's is widely known for its football program, which consistently ranks in the top 25 in the nation at the NCAA Division III level. They are the winningest football program in Division III history, boasting a 653–251–24 record following the 2019 season. SJU is a 34-time conference champion, and four time national champion, having most recently won in 2003 against the University of Mount Union by a score of 24–6. Their rivalry with the nearby University of St. Thomas (UST) is considered to be one of the greatest rivalries in Division III football, with games regularly drawing tens of thousands of fans. Former St. John's offensive tackle Ben Bartch was drafted in the 4th round (116th overall) by Jacksonville Jaguars in the 2020 NFL draft. He is the first MIAC player to be drafted into the NFL since 2003.

 Golf: The 2012 SJU golf team was ranked third in the final Golf World/Nike Golf Coaches' Division III poll. They were ranked behind Oglethorpe (Ga.) and Methodist (N.C.). The Johnnies moved up a total of 15 spots throughout the year.
 Hockey: The 2012–2013 SJU hockey season ended in the first round of the NCAA Division III Men's Hockey Tournament in Eau Claire, Wisconsin. The Johnnies lost to Wisconsin-Eau Claire 4–2. Wisconsin was ranked fourth and had beaten the Johnnies earlier in the season 5 to 1. SJU's record was 16–8–4 (9–4–3 MIAC).
 Rugby: Thomas Haigh, an instructor in the St. John's department of mathematics, founded the St. John's Rugby Club in the spring of 1968. A former St. John's Prep School student, he learned the game while an undergraduate at the University of Wisconsin. Rugby is a club sport at Saint John's. The Saint John's University rugby team captured the National Small College championship with a 31–16 win over Duke University Sunday, April 28, 2013, at Infinity Park, Glendale, Colo. They repeated this accomplishment again, defeating New England College 37–25 in a comeback win on April 27, 2014, at Infinity Park. A total of 211 teams competed for the National Small College championship, which is based on men's enrollment (schools must have fewer than 4,500 male students to compete in this division).
 Soccer: SJU opened at its new soccer complex in the 2013 season. In 2012, the Johnnies ended the soccer season with a 9-6-4 (6-2-2 MIAC) record and finished fourth.
 Track and Field: The SJU Track and Field team finished fifth out of eleven teams at the 2013 MIAC Indoor Track & Field Championships. They were only 1.5 points from fourth place. Kevin Horton placed second in the 200-meter dash and was awarded his second All-MIAC performance. He was only 0.05 from the conference title. Brady O'Brien earned his first All-MIAC honor when he finished second in the triple jump. Willie Versen was awarded his first All-MIAC when he won third place in the 3,000 meters.
 Wrestling: Seniors Mitch Hagen and Chris Stevermer will compete at the NCAA Division III Championships on March 15–16. Mitch Hagen is ranked fourth in the 2013 tournament. Chris Stevermer was third at regionals and is unranked in the tournament. Both competed in the tournament in 2012, but lost against higher-ranked opponents. Four other Johnnies will compete in the national tournament. Ryan Arne, Ryan Michaelis, John Scepaniak, and Nick Schuler are all appearing at the national tournament for the first time.
 Lacrosse: The club was founded in 1986 by Peter Farrell, under faculty advisement of Brother Dietrich Reinhardt, OSB.  The club is a non-varsity, athletic program affiliated with and partially funded by SJU Student Services. A student board of directors consists of a president, vice-president, treasurer and secretaries that help run the administrative part of the club. The Johnnies participate in the Men's College Lacrosse Association and the Upper Midwest Lacrosse Conference.  The Johnnies have been the UMLC Division II Champions in 2004, 2005, 2007, 2008, 2011 and 2014.  They have earned a trip to the MCLA Division II National Championship Tournament in 2005, 2006, 2007, 2008, 2009, 2010, 2011, 2012, 2013 and 2014—appearing in the Final Four of the Tournament in 2006, 2007, 2009, 2013 and 2014.  The streak of 10-straight appearances in the National Championship Tournament is an MCLA record.  The Johnnies were the National Runner-Up in 2006, 2007 and 2014.
 Swim & Dive: The St. Johns Swim and Dive team is coached by Ben Gill.

Bennie athletics (CSB) 
Saint Benedict (CSB) joined the MIAC since the 1985–86 academic year, and competes in 11 intercollegiate varsity sports, which are: basketball, cross country, golf, ice hockey, lacrosse, soccer, softball, swimming & diving, tennis, track & field and volleyball. In 2019 the athletic teams at CSB were officially rebranded and changed from the "Blazers" to the "Bennies".

A renovation and expansion of Haehn Campus Center and Murray Hall is underway. The new center includes a fitness center with racquetball courts, climbing wall, and an exercise science lab. Future phases include a new field house, hockey arena, and a natatorium. The renovation is being led by JLG Architects and Hastings+Chivetta.

 Basketball: Blazers basketball has won the MIAC championship five times in recent years and has made 15 NCAA Division III tournament appearances. Blazers basketball coach Mike Durbin is MIAC career wins leader and celebrated his 500th win in the 2008–2009 basketball season.
 Golf: Blazer golf is coached by Daryl Schomer, who started as head coach in the 2011–2012 season. In his first season at CSB as head coach, Schomer led the Blazers to finish third in the MIAC. The Blazers finished in fifth place at the 2012 MIAC Championships. The Blazers shot the seventh-best round of the tournament in the final round, led by a 79 from Bridget Cummings, who place 11th individually. The MIAC Tournament wrapped up the Blazers' fall season, where they won twice and finished in the top-five four times.
Hockey: Bennie hockey is coached my Nick Thibault and assisted by Dale Sager. The 2018–2019 season was coach Thibaults first year coaching for the Bennies following prior coach Jennifer Kranz who was with the team from 2011 to 2018. The Bennies ended the 2018–2019 season with a 7–14–2 record, which is one of the best they have had in decades.
 Volleyball: Blazers volleyball had made appearances in the NCAA National Tournament 14 times, most recently in 2012, and has won the MIAC Conference Championship seven times, most recently in 2009. The volleyball team has been coached by Nicole Hess since 2009, with assistant coaches Amanda Anderson, Theresa Naumann, and Heather Piper-Olsen. Coach Nicole Hess achieved her 100th win as a coach on November 1, 2011, against Gustavus Adolphus College.
 Rugby: CSB rugby is a club sport founded in 1978. In fall 2009 the team won the DIII State Championship moving to DII status. In 2011 the team placed second in the DII State Championship and moved on to compete in the Midwest Sweet Sixteen in Champaign, Illinois. The team is DIII and coached by CSB rugby alumna Carolyn Cooper. In fall 2014 the team competed in the Sweet Sixteen in Rochester, MN. NSCRO released its top-20 rankings for the fall season with CSB being 13th. The team finished the season 3rd in Minnesota and 4th in the Midwest Region.
 Tennis: Blazers tennis is coached by Michael Engdahl, who just became head coach in the 2016–2017 season.  He is joined by Emily Heying, also in her first year as an assistant coach.  Blazers tennis was previously coached by Scott Larsen, who was head coach for nine years.
Lacrosse: Bennie lacrosse is a club sport offered at the College of Saint Benedict. Bennie lacrosse is coached by Amanda Dvorak. In 2010, 2014, 2015, 2016, 2017, and 2018 the team participated in the WCLA Nationals Tournament at the Division II club level. CSB has placed in these tournaments, allowing it to be ranked among the top 10 club teams in the nation. In the 2019 season, the team finished 20th in the Nation. 
Softball: Bennie Softball is coached by head coach Rachael Click and is assisted by Mike Eveslage, Tyler Thomes, and Ashley Thell. Head coach Rachael Click is in her 7th season as the CSB head coach after a very successful college career herself at Gustavus Adolphus College. Click has guided Bennie softball to a school-record of 36 wins. In 2018 the team made its first NCAA appearance and made it as high as 13th in the Nation. 
Swim and Dive: St. Bens Swim and Dive is coached by Amanda Wolvert and is assisted by Jon Hazen and Sam Engel. Diving coach, Jon Hazen has been working with St. Bens since the 2010–11 season and coached high school for 9 years prior.
Cross Country: Cross Country is coached by Robin Balder-Lanoue. Robin is in her 22nd season as the head coach. 
Track and Field: Track and Field are coached by Robin Balder-Lanoue and assisted by John Pollack. 
Soccer: Bennie soccer is coached by Steve Kimble.

Club sports 
Club sports at CSB-SJU have a "no-cut policy". At CSB, club sports include crew, dance team, figure skating, lacrosse, Nordic skiing, rugby, ultimate Frisbee, and volleyball. At SJU, club sports include crew, lacrosse, Nordic skiing, rugby, ultimate Frisbee, water polo, and volleyball.

Notable alumni

 Tom Burnett: hero of United Airlines Flight 93 during the September 11, 2001 attacks. Attended SJU for two years, but did not graduate.
 William Joseph "Bill" Cody, Jr.: Hollywood B-western film actor, who attended SJU but may not have graduated
 Edward Devitt ('34): U.S. Congressman 1947–1949 and U.S. District Court Judge
 David Durenberger: former U.S. Senator
 Canning Fok: Hong Kong entrepreneur
 Connor Franta: American vlogger, Internet personality, writer and entrepreneur. Attended SJU for two years, but did not graduate.
 Jon Hassler: novelist
 Patrick Hicks ('92): novelist, poet
 Vedie Himsl ('38): baseball player and coach
 Mark Kennedy: former U.S. Congressman
 Michael King (2013): handball player, US Olympic Handball team
 Bill Kling: co-founder and president of American Public Media
 John Knauf, justice of the North Dakota Supreme Court (attended but graduated elsewhere)
 Franklin J. Knoll, Minnesota state legislator, lawyer, and judge
 Bernie Kukar: former National Football League referee
 Tom Love: owner, founder, and chairman of Love's Travel Stops & Country Stores (dropped out)
 January Yusuf Makamba: Tanzanian CCM politician and Member of Parliament for Bumbuli constituency
 Eugene McCarthy ('35): American politician, poet, and a long-time Congressman from Minnesota. He served in the United States House of Representatives from 1949 to 1959 and the United States Senate from 1959 to 1971.
 John McCutcheon: Grammy-winning folk musician
 Denis McDonough ('92): chief of staff to President Barack Obama. Incumbent United States Secretary of Veterans Affairs under President Joseph Biden. 
 John McDowell: National Football League player
 John McNally, a.k.a. "Johnny Blood": National Football League Hall of Famer
 Larry Millett: journalist and author
 Paul M. Nakasone ('86): U.S. Army general, commander, United States Army Cyber Command; director, National Security Agency
 Lino Rulli ('93): Emmy-winning producer and radio host (The Catholic Guy)
 Michael D. Ryan: U.S. Marine Corps lieutenant, recipient of two Purple Hearts and a Bronze Star, (Vietnam), Arizona state supreme court justice
 Richard Sabers ('60): South Dakota supreme court justice
 Mike Schmitz: Catholic priest, public speaker, and podcaster
 Matt Schnobrich: 2008 Summer Olympics bronze medalist in rowing
 Eugene P. Sheehy: head academic librarian at Columbia University, 1967–1986
 George Sinner ('50): Governor of North Dakota 1985–1992
 Erik Sommer (2000): contemporary artist
 Stephen Sommers: movie director
 Mark Vande Hei ('89): astronaut
 Jack Webb: television producer, star of Dragnet (franchise)
 Jerome J. Workman, Jr.: prolific author and editor of scientific reference works on the subject of spectroscopy; a noted analytical spectroscopist.
 Gordon Zahn: writer and pacifist who attended briefly but was pressured to leave.  Zahn later wrote In Solitary Witness: The Life and Death of Franz Jägerstätter and German Catholics and Hitler's Wars. He received St. John's Pax Christi Award.

Notable alumnae 
 Kimberly M. Blaeser: author; 2015-2016 Wisconsin Poet Laureate
 Elizabeth A. Hayden: retired Minnesota judge
 Baulu Kuan: Chinese-American artist and curator
 Ann Lenczewski: politician and former member of the Minnesota House of Representatives (DFL)
 Mary Ellen Otremba: politician and former member of the Minnesota House of Representatives (DFL)
 Michele Specht: actress and comedian
 Yuko Taniguchi ('98): poet and author
 Corie (Dumdie) Barry (‘97): chief executive officer, Best Buy
 Kaleb (Billy) Newman (‘03): The Source

Notable faculty and staff 
 Miguel H. Díaz, theology professor, United States ambassador to the Holy See (2009–12)
 John Gagliardi, regents professor (1953–2018, died 2018) and football coach (1953–2012)
 Fr. Columba Stewart OSB, executive director of HMML, 2016 Guggenheim Fellowship awardee
 Axel Theimer, emeritus professor of music

See also

 List of colleges and universities in Minnesota
 Saint John's Preparatory School (Minnesota)

References

External links 
 

 
 Official CSB Blazers athletics website
 Official SJU Johnnies athletics website

 

 
Saint John's University (Minnesota)
Saint Benedict, College of
Saint Benedict, College of
Benedictine colleges and universities
Education in Stearns County, Minnesota
Buildings and structures in Stearns County, Minnesota
Tourist attractions in Stearns County, Minnesota
Catholic universities and colleges in Minnesota
Association of Catholic Colleges and Universities
Liberal arts colleges in Minnesota
1913 establishments in Minnesota
University and college buildings on the National Register of Historic Places in Minnesota